Jean Loup Wolfman (born January 23, 1969) is  an American actor, appearing in film, theater, television and commercials.

Childhood 
Jean Loup was born and raised in NYC by his mother Janet Wolfman.

Career 
In the Theater, Jean Loup's first appearance on the NYC stage was as a baby at the La Mama theater, in the show Goldfinger.

Over his career, he appeared in a number of plays around New York, including Shakespeare's, Titus Andronicus, later turned into a film by the director Julie Taymor, Orestes by En Garde Arts, a number of Off Broadway productions of Shakespeare and various musical roles in Summer Stock.

On Television, he appeared for part of a season as Bruce Dreyfuss , on the soap opera, As The World Turns and appeared in an episode of The Cosby Show.

Jean Loup appeared in the film Twisted, directed by Seth Michael Donsky, which was based on Charles Dickens' book Oliver Twist.  Jean Loup plays the Artful Dodger character, a gay rent boy and a hustler who goes among his "clientele" by the name "Fine Art". Jean Loup is featured prominently in the film as well as in the theatrical release poster and the DVD release.

Jean Loup has also taken part in the 2007 film The Lucky Man starring Frank Vincent and Vincent Pastore. And a walk on role in the film Broadway Damage.

Modeling credits include sessions for Levi's 501, Nike, the Gap, and Bad Boy.

And commercials for Levi's 501, Coca-Cola, Pepsi with MC Hammer, and ATT

Today 
In 2019, he legally changed his name to Soaw Nyce and moved to Europe to raise his newborn son, Aidan Nyce.

Since moving,  he has appeared in the film  LET ME LIVE and done parts for the YT channel Secret Diaries, for Bored Panda.

He was also profiled on CBS news as a local hero ,  as the street dancer who stopped a mugging on the NYC subways.

Filmography
1996: Twisted as Arthur ("Fine Art"), a gay hustler, film directed by Set Michael Donsky
2007: The Lucky Man directed by Ruvin Orbach

References

External links

American male film actors
Living people
1969 births
People from Fort Greene, Brooklyn